John Evelyn (1620–1706) was an English writer.

John Evelyn is also the name of:

John Evelyn (1591–1664), English politician, MP for Bletchingley
John Evelyn (Parliamentarian) (1601–1685), English politician
John Evelyn the Younger (1655–1699), English translator
Sir John Evelyn, 1st Baronet, of Godstone (1633–1671)
John Evelyn (1677–1702), English politician, MP for Bletchingley
Sir John Evelyn, 1st Baronet, of Wotton (1682–1763), British politician
Sir John Evelyn, 2nd Baronet MP for Helston 1727–1741 and 1747–1767 and Penryn 1741–1747
John Evelyn of Wotton (1743–1827), cousin of Frederick Evelyn
Sir John Evelyn, 4th Baronet (c. 1758 – 1833)
John Evelyn (bobsleigh) (born 1939), British Olympic bobsledder

See also